Gamble is a surname of English origin. It is the 943rd most common surname in the United Kingdom. Notable people with the surname include:
Bobby Gamble, English-Irish cricketer
Cheryl Gamble (born 1970), American singer
Chris Gamble (born 1983), American football player
Clarence Gamble, American heir of the Procter and Gamble soap company fortune
Clarence Gamble (tennis player)
David Gamble (film editor) (born June 24, 1955), British film editor
Donte Gamble (born 1978), American football player
Frances Gamble (1949-1997), South African climatologist and speleologist
Fred Gamble (racing driver) (born 1932), Formula One racer
Fred Gamble (actor) (1868–1939), actor
Frederick William Gamble (1869–1926), English zoologist
James Gamble (industrialist) (1803–1891), co-founder of Procter & Gamble
James Sykes Gamble (1847–1925), botanist
Jim Gamble, British police officer
John A. Gamble (1933–2009), Canadian politician
John M. Gamble (1791–1836), United States Marine Corps officer 
Julian Gamble (born 1989), American basketball player in the Israeli Basketball Premier League
Kenneth Gamble (born 1943), songwriter and producer
Kevin Gamble (born 1965), American professional basketball player
Kevin Gamble (netcaster) (born 1973), filmmaker, animation producer, and podcaster
Mason Gamble (born 1986), child actor who went on to become a marine biologist
Miriam Gamble (born 1980), poet 
Nathan Gamble (born 1998), American child actor
Oscar Gamble (born 1949), former outfielder in Major League Baseball
Peter Gamble (1793–1814), United States Navy officer
Ryan Gamble (born 1987), Australian rules footballer
Troy Gamble (born 1967), American hockey player
William Gamble (general) (1818–1866), civil engineer and Union cavalry officer in the American Civil War
William Gamble (business) (1805–1881), Canadian businessman

References

English-language surnames